Venus and the Razorblades were a short-lived punk rock band from Los Angeles, California, formed and managed by Kim Fowley after he severed professional relations with The Runaways. They are believed to be one of the first mixed-gender American punk band. The band included guitarist/singer Roni Lee (born Rhonda Lee Ryckman), who had co-written the song "I Wanna Be Where the Boys Are" for the Runaways; guitarist/singer Steven T. (Tetsch); bassist Danielle Faye (formerly of Atomic Kid); drummer Nickey Beat (formerly of The Weirdos and the Germs) (who was soon replaced by Kyle Raven); and singers Dyan Diamond and Vicki Razorblade (born Vicki Arnold). When the band formed, Diamond and Razorblade were only 14 and 17 years old respectively. Session musicians were used in some of the band's recordings.

The Woman's International Music Network, founded by Laura B. Whitmore, gives credit to Venus and the Razorblades, as well as the Runaways, for performing in a genre that was dominated mostly by men. Venus and the Razorblades played a memorable concert with Van Halen at the Whisky a Go Go in 1976, and Van Halen sometimes played the Venus and the Razorblades song "Young and Wild" in their early concert performances.

The band put out a novelty single called "Punk-A-Rama" on the independent label Bomp! Records to capitalize on the popularity of the punk rock genre, but then broke up. A compilation album called Songs from the Sunshine Jungle was released in 1978 on Visa Records; it is extremely rare today. After Venus and the Razorblades disbanded, Fowley tried to make Dyan Diamond into a star, and got a deal for her with MCA Records; her 1978 album, In the Dark was a commercial failure. Roni Lee collaborated and performed with Randy California and Ed Cassidy of Spirit, as well as Mars Bonfire and Jerry Edmonton of Steppenwolf, in 1977-78. In 2004 a follow-up album release on CD, "More Songs From The Sunshine Jungle" was issued on Charlatan Records. In 2013, Lee was granted an endorsement with Paul Reed Smith guitars for her distinctive style of playing as well as her place in punk rock's early history.   Lee released the album Heros of Sunset Blvd. in 2016.

References

External links
[ Allmusic]
 Venus and the Razorblades

American new wave musical groups